The Pig War was a confrontation in 1859 between the United States and the United Kingdom over the British–U.S. border in the San Juan Islands, between Vancouver Island (present-day Canada) and the State of Washington. The Pig War, so called because it was triggered by the shooting of a pig, is also called the Pig Episode, the Pig and Potato War, the San Juan Boundary Dispute, and the Northwestern Boundary Dispute. Despite being referred to as a "war" there were no casualties on either side, aside from the pig.

Background

Border ambiguity
The Oregon Treaty of June 15, 1846, resolved the Oregon boundary dispute by dividing the Oregon Country/Columbia District between the United States and Britain "along the forty-ninth parallel of north latitude to the middle of the channel which separates the continent from Vancouver Island, and thence southerly through the middle of the said channel, and of the Strait of Juan de Fuca, to the Pacific Ocean."

However, two straits could be called the middle of the channel: Haro Strait, along the west side of the San Juan Islands; and Rosario Strait, along the east side.

In 1846, there was still some uncertainty about the region's geography. The most commonly available maps were those of George Vancouver, published in 1798, and of Charles Wilkes, published in 1845. In both cases, the maps are unclear in the vicinity of the southeastern coast of Vancouver Island and the Gulf Islands. As a result, Haro Strait is not fully clear either.

In 1856, the US and Britain set up a Boundary Commission to resolve several issues regarding the international boundary, including the water boundary from the Strait of Georgia to the Strait of Juan de Fuca. The British appointed James Charles Prevost First Commissioner, George Henry Richards Second Commissioner, and William A. G. Young Secretary. The US appointed Archibald Campbell First Commissioner, John Parke Second Commissioner, and William J. Warren Secretary. On June 27, 1857, the American and British commissioners met for the first time on board the British ship HMS Satellite, anchored in Esquimalt Harbour. The two sides met several more times in 1857 in Esquimalt Harbour and Nanaimo Harbour, and corresponded by letter between meetings. The water boundary was discussed from October to December. From the start, Prevost maintained that Rosario Strait was required by the treaty's wording and was intended by the treaty framers, while Campbell had the same opinion for Haro Strait. 

Prevost held that the channel specified in the treaty must have three essential qualities:
 it must separate the continent from Vancouver Island
 it must carry the boundary in a southerly direction
 it must be navigable

Only Rosario fulfilled these requirements, he wrote. Campbell countered that the expression "southerly", in the treaty, was to be understood in a general sense, that Rosario Strait did not separate the continent from Vancouver Island, but the San Juan Islands from Lummi Island, Cypress Island, Fidalgo Island, and others, and that navigability was not germane to the issue, but even if it was, Haro Strait was the wider and more direct passage. Finally, he challenged Prevost to produce any evidence showing that the treaty framers had intended Rosario Strait. Prevost responded to the challenge by referring to American maps showing the boundary running through Rosario Strait, including one by John C. Frémont, produced for and published by the US government, and another by John B. Preston, Surveyor General of Oregon in 1852. To the other points, Prevost repeated his statements about Rosario Strait's navigability—the channels between Lummi, Cypress, and Fidalgo islands not being navigable—and that a line through Rosario would be southerly. At the same time, one through Haro would have to be drawn westerly. The two continued to discuss the issue into December 1857, until it was clear what each side's argument was and that neither would be convinced of the other. Prevost made a final offer at the sixth meeting, on December 3. He suggested a compromise line through San Juan Channel, which would give the US all the main islands except San Juan Island. This offer was rejected and the commission adjourned, agreeing to report back to their respective governments. Thus ambiguity over the water boundary remained.

Because of this ambiguity, both the United States and Britain claimed sovereignty over the San Juan Islands. During this period of disputed sovereignty, Britain's Hudson's Bay Company established operations on San Juan and turned the island into a sheep ranch. Meanwhile, by mid-1859, twenty-five to twenty-nine American settlers had arrived.

San Juan Island held significance not for its size, but as a military strategic point. While the British held Fort Victoria on Vancouver Island to the west, overlooking the Strait of Juan de Fuca, the entry point to Haro Strait, leading to the Strait of Georgia, the nation that held the San Juan Islands would be able to dominate all the straits connecting the Strait of Juan de Fuca with the Strait of Georgia.

Political context

General George B. McClellan, George Pickett’s West Point classmate and lifelong friend, claimed that General William S. Harney and Pickett conspired with a cabal, to start a war with  Britain, creating a common enemy, to head off a north–south confrontation. However, General Granville O. Haller debunked McClellan's theory. He said they had wanted to start a war, but with hope of distracting the north so that the south could secede from the union.
The theories are given credence when it is noted that Major General Silas Casey, then a lieutenant colonel and deputy commander of the 9th Infantry Regiment, was reduced to a support role for Captain George Pickett who was given independent jurisdiction over a vast area by Harney, then a brevet major, and was also passed over by Harney in favor of Pickett when given this choice command.

On the other hand, it can be said that Lieutenant Colonel Casey had not been reduced, for he was given command over the USS Massachusetts and Major Haller to protect and supervise the water of Puget Sound. He was given discretion to deviate from his orders, based on his military experience. (His textbook on infantry tactics was used at West Point during the Civil War.)

The pig incident

On June 15, 1859, exactly 13 years after the adoption of the Oregon Treaty, the ambiguity led to direct conflict. Lyman Cutlar, an American farmer who had moved onto San Juan Island claiming rights to live there under the Donation Land Claim Act, found a pig rooting in his garden and eating his tubers. This was not the first occurrence and as a result Cutlar shot the pig, killing it. It turned out that the pig was owned by an Irishman, Charles Griffin, who was employed by the Hudson's Bay Company to run the sheep ranch on the island. He also owned several pigs that he allowed to roam freely. The two had lived in peace until this incident. Cutlar offered $10 to Griffin to compensate for the pig, but Griffin was unsatisfied with this offer and demanded $100. Following this reply, Cutlar believed he should not have to pay for the pig because the pig had been trespassing on his land. One likely apocryphal account has Cutlar saying to Griffin, "It was eating my potatoes"; and Griffin replying, "It is up to you to keep your potatoes out of my pig." When British authorities threatened to arrest Cutlar, American settlers called for military protection.

Military escalation
 Brigadier General William S. Harney, commanding the Department of Oregon, initially dispatched Captain George Pickett and 66 American soldiers of the 9th Infantry Regiment under Pickett's command, to San Juan Island with orders to prevent the British from landing; the regiment sailed aboard . Concerned that a squatter population of Americans would begin to occupy San Juan Island if the Americans were not kept in check, the British sent three warships under the command of Captain Geoffrey Hornby to counter the Americans. Pickett was quoted as saying defiantly, "We'll make a Bunker Hill of it," placing him in the national limelight. Pickett sited his company and battery near the Hudson's Bay Company's Belle Vue sheep farm located near today's Cattle Point Light, and directly under the guns of HMS Satellite, a British ship. When this tactical error was pointed out, Capt Pickett moved his battery of cannon a few miles north to high ground overlooking both Griffin Bay and the Strait of Juan de Fuca, and commenced to build a redoubt for his cannon.

Pickett established the American camp near the south end of San Juan Island, today one of two historical sites on the island, the other being the British camp, defended by the Royal Marines on the north end of the island. The camp redoubt was built under the supervision of new West Point graduate 2nd Lieutenant Henry Martyn Robert; Robert went on to become a general in the Army of the Potomac during the American Civil War and author of Robert's Rules of Order. Robert's Redoubt is considered the best-preserved fortification of its kind in the United States. (To the east is Jackle's Lagoon, named for George Jackle, a soldier stationed at the American camp.)

The situation continued to escalate. By August 10, 1859, 461 Americans with 14 cannons under Colonel Silas Casey were opposed by five British warships mounting 70 guns and carrying 2,140 men.

The governor of the Colony of Vancouver Island, James Douglas, had ordered Captain Hornby to dislodge the American troops, avoiding armed conflict if possible. At the time, the additional reinforcements sent by American General Harney had not yet arrived, and the island was occupied by only Pickett's 66 men. Hornby refused to take any action until British Rear Admiral Robert L. Baynes, who was in command of the British Navy in the Pacific, would arrive himself. When Baynes finally came and took stock of the situation, he told Governor Douglas that he would not escalate the conflict into a war between great nations "over a squabble about a pig".

Resolution
When news about the crisis reached Washington and London, officials from both nations were shocked and took action to calm the potentially explosive international incident.

In September, U.S. President James Buchanan sent General Winfield Scott to negotiate with Governor Douglas and resolve the growing crisis. This was in the best interest of the United States, as sectionalist tensions within the country were increasing, soon to culminate in the Civil War. Scott had calmed two other border crises between the two nations in the late 1830s. He arrived in the San Juans in October and began negotiations with Douglas.

As a result of the negotiations, both sides agreed to retain joint military occupation of the island until a final settlement could be reached, reducing their presence to a token force of no more than 100 men. The British camp was established on the north end of San Juan Island along the shoreline, for ease of supply and access; and the American camp was created on the south end on a high, windswept meadow, suitable for artillery barrages against shipping. Today the Union Jack still flies above the British camp site, being raised and lowered daily by park rangers, making it one of the few places without diplomatic status where U.S. government employees regularly hoist the flag of another country, though this is only for commemorative purposes.

During the years of joint military occupation, the small British and American units on San Juan Island had an amicable mutual social life, visiting one another's camps to celebrate their respective national holidays and holding various athletic competitions. Park rangers tell visitors the biggest threat to peace on the island during these years was "the large amounts of alcohol available".

This state of affairs continued for the next 12 years. The dispute was peacefully resolved after more than a decade of confrontation and military bluster, during which time local British authorities lobbied London to seize back the Puget Sound region while the Americans were busy elsewhere with the Civil War. In 1866, the Colony of Vancouver Island was merged with the Colony of British Columbia to form an enlarged Colony of British Columbia. In 1871, the enlarged colony joined the newly formed Dominion of Canada. That year, the United Kingdom and the United States signed the Treaty of Washington, which dealt with various differences between the two nations, including border issues involving the newly formed dominion. Among the results of the treaty was the decision to resolve the San Juan dispute by international arbitration, with German Emperor Wilhelm I chosen to act as arbitrator, meaning that the German Empire would decide if the British or the Americans would officially own the San Juan Islands.  Presenting for the United States in the San Juan arbitration was George Bancroft who displayed great versatility and skill and won the case.  Wilhelm referred the issue to a three-man arbitration commission which met in Geneva for nearly a year. On October 21, 1872, the commission decided in favor of the United States' offer. The arbitrators chose the American-preferred marine boundary via Haro Strait, to the west of the islands, over the British preference for Rosario Strait which lay to their east.

On November 25, 1872, the British withdrew their Royal Marines from the British camp. The Americans followed by July 1874.

The Pig War is commemorated in San Juan Island National Historical Park.

Key figures
 Henry Martyn Robert who later published Robert's Rules of Order was stationed on the island for much of the period.
 Captain George Pickett, later of Pickett's Charge fame, was in charge of the initial American landing force.
 Captain Geoffrey Hornby, commander of the initial British naval force deployed, was later promoted to Admiral of the Fleet, the highest rank in the Royal Navy, and earned a reputation as a pre-eminent tactician and fleet commander.

Gallery

See also

 Aroostook War, the "Northeastern Boundary Dispute"
 List of conflicts in the United States
 List of conflicts in Canada
 List of bloodless wars
 Military history of Canada
 Military history of the United Kingdom
 Military history of the United States
 The Great Rapprochement, a convergence of goals between the United States and the British Empire in subsequent decades
 Point Roberts
 War of the Stray Dog, a brief war that began under similar circumstances.

References

Further reading

External links

 The Pig War, National Park Service
 The Pig War of San Juan Island
 San Juan Island Pig War – Part 1, HistoryLink.org
 Lyman Cutlar touches off Pig War between U.S. and Great Britain on June 15, 1859, HistoryLink.org

 
Canada–United States border disputes
Battles and conflicts without fatalities
Diplomatic incidents
Conflicts in 1859
George Pickett
Pre-Confederation British Columbia
History of Washington (state)
Military history of Canada
History of the Pacific Northwest
Conflicts in Canada
Coast of British Columbia
Arbitration cases
United Kingdom–United States military relations
Presidency of James Buchanan